Andorra women's team played its first friendly match in 2014 and its first official one in 2015. It is organised and headed by Andorran Football Federation.

This is a list of the Andorra women's national football team results.

2014

2015

2016

2017

2019

2021

2022

Andorra women's national football team
Women's national association football team results